Omkar Nath Koul (7 January 1934 – 7 Dec 2019) was a Kashmiri linguist. As a researcher, his interests included the areas of linguistics, language education, communications management, and comparative literature. Since the 1970s he has held several academic and administrative positions. In particular, he had been a professor at the LBS National Academy of Administration, Mussoorie, India, and a professor at the Central Institute of Indian Languages, Mysore, India. Koul also served as the director of the Central Institute of Indian Languages from 1999 to 2000.

Selected bibliography

Relating to Kashmir

Other works

References 

1941 births
2018 deaths
20th-century Indian linguists
Linguists of Indo-Aryan languages
Linguists of Kashmiri
Linguists of Hindi
Linguists of Punjabi
Linguists of Urdu
People from Kulgam district